A World Without Men (Die Welt ohne Männer) is a 1914 silent film made in Germany just before the start of World War I and directed by Max Mack. A comedy, it was written by Alexander Engel and Julius Horst.

The popular British entertainer Madge Lessing appeared at the Berlin Metropol in Berlin for four years before the start of World War I and during that period she made a number of films for Max Mack including The Blue Mouse (1913), Where Is Coletti? (1913) and A World Without Men (1914).

Synopsis
A comedy in four acts, the film parodied the concerns at that time in Germany regarding women's emancipation and suffrage. The film centres on a young woman named Gusti (Madge Lessing), one of three sisters who refuse to consider any sort of a relationship with a man, believing that marriage simply confirmed the cruel dominance of men over women. However, Gusti meets a suitable suitor, Dr. Carl Waldeck (Otto Treptow) with whom she falls in love and their growing relationship leads to various comedic situations. She changes her mind about the beastly nature of men as she falls more for her handsome and near-perfect suitor.

Cast
Madge Lessing  ...  Gusti 
Ida Frey   ...  Paula  
Alvine Davis   ...  Christel  
Otto Treptow   ...  Dr. Carl Waldeck  
Herbert Paulmüller   ...  Dr. Specht  
Erwin Fichtner   ...  Assistant Fritz  
Martha Hoffmann   ...  Ludmilla  
Willy Lengling   ...  Schreiber Süssmilch

References

External links
A World Without Men on Internet Movie Database

1914 films
1914 comedy films
German comedy films
Films of the German Empire
German silent feature films
Films directed by Max Mack
German black-and-white films
Silent comedy films
1910s German films
1910s German-language films